In mathematics, the Scorer's functions are special functions studied by  and denoted Gi(x) and Hi(x). 

Hi(x) and -Gi(x) solve the equation 

 

and are given by

The Scorer's functions can also be defined in terms of Airy functions:

References
 

Special functions